Elínborg Halldórsdóttir (born 1962) is an Icelandic rock musician, and painter.
She was a member of the band Q4U.
She was also judge in the first ever series of the Icelandic version of The X Factor in 2006–2007, on Stöð 2.

References

External links
"X-Factor Furðulegt", Alvaran

1962 births
Living people
Ellinborg Halldorsdottir